Montegrosso Pian Latte is a comune (municipality) in the Province of Imperia in the Italian region Liguria, located about  southwest of Genoa and about  northwest of Imperia.

Geography 

The municipality of Montegrosso Pian Latte contains the frazione (subdivision) Case Fascei.

Montegrosso Pian Latte borders the following municipalities: Cosio di Arroscia, Mendatica, Molini di Triora, Pornassio, Rezzo, and Triora.

Demographic evolution

Twin towns — sister cities
Montegrosso Pian Latte is twinned with:

  Pontevès, France (2013)

References

See also
 Parco naturale regionale delle Alpi Liguri

Cities and towns in Liguria